John F. Horan (November 24, 1932 – November 14, 1980), also nicknamed "The Vertical Hyphen," was an American professional basketball player. Horan was selected in the 1955 NBA Draft (first round, sixth overall) by the Fort Wayne Pistons after a collegiate career at Dayton. He played for the Pistons in seven games before being traded to the Minneapolis Lakers in the middle of the 1955–56 season. While with the Lakers, Horan appeared in 12 games.

References

External links
 Johnny Horan @ TheDraftReview

1932 births
1980 deaths
All-American college men's basketball players
American men's basketball players
Basketball players from Minneapolis
Dayton Flyers men's basketball players
Fort Wayne Pistons draft picks
Fort Wayne Pistons players
Minneapolis Lakers players
Small forwards